Grzegorz Nowak (born 1 November 1954) is a Polish rower who competed in the 1980 Summer Olympics.

He was born in Luboń.

In 1980 he was a crew member of the Polish boat which won the bronze medal in the coxed fours event. At the same Olympics he also finished ninth with the Polish boat in the 1980 eights competition.

External links 
 

1954 births
Living people
Olympic rowers of Poland
Olympic bronze medalists for Poland
People from Luboń
Polish male rowers
Rowers at the 1980 Summer Olympics
Olympic medalists in rowing
Sportspeople from Greater Poland Voivodeship
Medalists at the 1980 Summer Olympics